Gea Johnson (born September 18, 1967) is a retired American heptathlete turned bobsledder. She competed in the two woman event at the 2002 Winter Olympics.

References

External links
 

1967 births
Living people
American female bobsledders
American heptathletes
Olympic bobsledders of the United States
Bobsledders at the 2002 Winter Olympics
People from Monticello, Utah
21st-century American women